David James Ritchie  (born 20 June 1953) is an Australian diplomat and a senior career officer with the Department of Foreign Affairs and Trade (DFAT). His last appointment was as Ambassador for Australia to Germany, a post to which he was appointed in 2013.

Early life
Ritchie holds a Bachelor of Arts (Honours) degree from the University of Queensland in German language and literature, which he obtained in 1975.

Diplomatic career
Ritchie began his diplomatic career with a posting at the Australian embassy in Bonn (West Germany), where he served from 1975–1978, and from 1981-1983 he was posted to the Australian embassy in East Berlin (East Germany).

Between 1992 and 1997 Ritchie held various positions in the Department of the Prime Minister and Cabinet.

From 1999 to 2001 Ritchie was a senior foreign affairs adviser to Australian Prime Minister John Howard, and from 2001 was promoted to Deputy Secretary at DFAT.

In 2002, Ritchie was appointed as chargé d'affaires at the Australian Embassy in Jakarta until a replacement for Ric Smith was appointed. Some saw David Irvine as a good replacement for Smith, given his knowledge of the Indonesian language, but Ritchie was appointed as the Ambassador of Australia to Indonesia by the Australian government to oversee the relationship between the two countries, which is seen as one of the most complex. He served in this position until 2005, including at the time of the 2004 Australian Embassy bombing in Jakarta, and the 2005 Bali bombings. For his work at this time, Ritchie was awarded the Group Bravery Citation on 29 August 2005 and made an Officer of the Order of Australia (AO) on 13 June 2005 for "service to ensuring Australia's long-term security interests in the region through efforts to gain co-operative action to address the threat of terrorism."

On 10 May 2010, Ritchie was appointed as Ambassador of Australia to Italy, with concurrent accreditation to San Marino. He took up the post in mid-July that year, and remained in the position until November 2013.

On 24 October 2013, Ritchie was appointed as Ambassador of Australia to Germany, with concurrent accreditation to Liechtenstein and Switzerland. In July 2016, Ritchie was awarded with the Commander's Cross of the Order of Merit of the Federal Republic of Germany by Minister of State in the Foreign Office, Maria Böhmer.

References

Attribution

  

Ambassadors of Australia to Italy
Ambassadors of Australia to Albania
Ambassadors of Australia to San Marino
Ambassadors of Australia to Libya
Ambassadors of Australia to Indonesia
Ambassadors of Australia to Germany
Ambassadors of Australia to Liechtenstein
Ambassadors of Australia to Switzerland
Ambassadors of Australia to France
Ambassadors of Australia to Morocco
Ambassadors of Australia to Monaco
Ambassadors of Australia to Mauritania
Ambassadors of Australia to Algeria
Australian diplomats
University of Queensland alumni
Living people
Officers of the Order of Australia
Commanders Crosses of the Order of Merit of the Federal Republic of Germany
1953 births